Ajay Vidyasagar (born 1969 in India) is an experienced executive in the TV and online video industry. He studied Economics in the University of Madras and obtained two post-graduate certificates from the Indian School of Business

Career 
Ajay started as an account manager at Oglivy & Advertising. He progressed quickly to become the President of Star India Pte Ltd  and was awarded STAR Employee of the year in 1997, and STAR Achiever of the year in 2002. He then became the chief operating officer of Sun Network in 2009, one of the most profitable broadcaster in Asia. Under his leadership, Sun TV launched successful shows such as Robot, starring Aishwarya Rai Bachchan opposite Rajinikanth. Sun Network also joined Network18 Group to form a new distribution company  Sun 18 Media Services which today distributes 32 channels in India.

After quitting  Sun TV he joined Google as regional head and  based out of Singapore since 2011. He is leading its New Product & Solutions function for YouTube and the Google Video Network in the Asia Pacific.

Awards
 Employee of the year at STAR India-1997
 STAR Achiever of the year – 2002 (including a citation from Rupert Murdoch, the chairman of Newscorp)
 Winner of the " Entrepreneur of the year" for corporate innovation and creativity in the India brand summit in 2006
 Media Marketer of the Year in 2006 for the record breaking launch of India’s most successful TV show Kaun Banaega Crorepati 2, Indian version of" Who wants to be a Millionaire"

Presentations and interviews
2007: Seven things that shaped the Indian Television Industry, at event by Associated Chambers of Commerce and Industry of India
2008: India Conference at Harvard Business School
2013: Move People to Choose your Brand with Youtube, keynote address at Think with Google in Seoul
2016: How video consumption in India changed; YouTube honcho explains
2017: YouTube’s Ajay Vidyasagar on the change from an attention plentiful to an attention scarce era
2017: FICCI Frames India: Google’s Ajay Vidyasagar decodes online video revolution in India
2018: Malayali head of YouTube stands out with fresh ideas Our Correspondent NOVEMBER 16, 2018 04:13 PM IS...
2018: Rural women powering internet revolution: YouTube's Ajay Vidyasagar...
2018: When YouTube made Jackie Chan and Mohanlal to tango ...

References

Living people
Indian television executives
1969 births
Sun Group
Indian chief operating officers